José Márcio Corrêa Ayres (February 21, 1954 – March 7, 2003) was a Brazilian primatologist and conservationist who founded the Mamirauá Sustainable Development Reserve in 1996, followed by the Amanã Sustainable Development Reserve in 1998.

Ayres devoted his life to the preservation of the unique biota and ecosystems of the Amazon, as well as to developing a method by which rural dwellers would benefit from the conservation of natural resources. He realized that the uakari monkeys he had been studying for his doctoral thesis would stand no chance of survival unless new community-based models of natural resource management were applied to the much exploited Amazon river basin.

Ayres' doctorate in primatology at Sidney Sussex College, Cambridge in 1986 was for his thesis Uakaris and Amazonian flooded forest, the field work for which was undertaken on the upper Amazon River floodplain, near Tefé.

Ayres died of lung cancer in 2003 at the Mount Sinai Hospital in New York, United States.

Selected publications

References

External sources 
 Mamirauá Institute for Sustainable Development

1954 births
2003 deaths
Alumni of Sidney Sussex College, Cambridge
University of São Paulo alumni
Recipients of the National Order of Scientific Merit (Brazil)